She is a funk album by Harry Connick Jr. recorded in 1994, accompanied by his newly formed funk band. "(I Could Only) Whisper Your Name" was included on Columbia Records' soundtrack from action-comedy The Mask, starring Jim Carrey. It was also Connick's only single to reach the Billboard charts, peaking at #67. The album was certified Platinum.

Reception

In The Village Voice, Robert Christgau panned She, finding McLean's lyrics "dumb" and the band's style of funk lacking in "elasticity and panache".

Tour

Connick took his funk music on a tour of the United Kingdom in 1994, and later to the People's Republic of China in 1995, playing at the Shanghai Center Theatre.
29 October 1994 at the Brighton Centre, some fans left unhappy with the change of direction not expecting the jazz funk of the 'She' album, despite the tour being billed as supporting the new album. Those that remained enjoyed a very energetic performance.

Connick's funk albums She, and Star Turtle sold respectably, though some fans were upset with Connick's departure from his jazz roots.

Track listing
All tracks by Harry Connick Jr. and Ramsey McLean except where noted.

"She" – 5:36
"Between Us" – 5:57
"Here Comes the Big Parade" – 4:11 – an ode to Mardi Gras
"Trouble" – 2:40
"(I Could Only) Whisper Your Name" – 4:50
"Follow the Music" – 1:00
"Joe Slam and the Spaceship" (Connick, Jonathan DuBose, Tony Hall) – 7:12
"To Love the Language" – 5:01
"Honestly Now (Safety's Just Danger...Out of Place)" – 5:31
"She...Blessed be the One" – 1:35
"Funky Dunky" (Connick) – 6:22
"Follow the Music Further" – 1:19
"That Party" – 5:12
"Booker" – 6:26

Promo track listing
"(I Could Only) Whisper Your Name" – 4:50
"To Love the Language" – 5:01
"Here Comes the Big Parade" – 4:11
"She" – 5:36

Personnel 
 Harry Connick Jr. – vocals, piano
 Jonathan Dubose – guitar, background vocals
 Howard Kaplan – keyboards, background vocals 
 George Porter Jr. – bass, background vocals
 David Russell Batiste Jr. – drums
 Michael Ward – percussion, background vocals
 Tony Hall – bass, background vocals 
 Raymond Weber – drums, background vocals
 Joseph "Zigaboo" Modeliste – drums, background vocals
 Tracey Freeman – producer, vocals, clap
 Leroy Jones – trumpet
 Mark Mullins – trombone
 Alonzo Bowens – saxophone
 Ramsey McLean – recitation, partyman, vocals
 Gregg Rubin – recording and mix engineer, clap, vocals
 Fieldfines Samantha Rambardi – woolen squeak trinket

Charts

Weekly charts

Year-end charts

Certifications and sales

References

1994 albums
Funk albums by American artists
Harry Connick Jr. albums